Jens Zemke (born 17 October 1966) is a German former racing cyclist. In 1999 he won the Hessen-Rundfahrt. In October 2016  announced that had been appointed as a directeur sportif.

References

External links
 
 

1966 births
Living people
German male cyclists
Sportspeople from Wiesbaden
Cyclists from Hesse